The following is a list of notable deaths in September 1990.

Entries for each day are listed alphabetically by surname. A typical entry lists information in the following sequence:
 Name, age, country of citizenship at birth, subsequent country of citizenship (if applicable), reason for notability, cause of death (if known), and reference.

September 1990

1
Buster Adams, 75, American baseball player, heart failure.
Afanasy Beloborodov, 87, Soviet general.
Arnoldo Gabaldón, 81, Venezuelan physician and politician.
Geir Hallgrímsson, 64, Icelandic politician, prime minister (1974–1978).
Stefán Kristjánsson, 66, Icelandic Olympic skier (1952, 1956).
Alex Levinsky, 80, American-born Canadian ice hockey player.
Edwin O. Reischauer, 79, American diplomat, hepatitis C.
Derviš Sušić, 65, Yugoslav writer.

2
John Bowlby, 83, British psychologist.
Sári Bíró, 83, Hungarian pianist.
Robert Holmes à Court, 53, South African-born Australian businessman, heart attack.
Marcus Cunliffe, 68, British scholar.
Erich Herker, 84, German ice hockey player.
Jože Javoršek, 69, Yugoslav and Slovenian playwright, writer, poet, and essayist.
Robert Francis Joyce, 93, American Roman Catholic prelate.
Léon van Hove, 66, Belgian physicist.

3
Slava Amiragov, 64, Soviet Olympic rower (1952, 1956).
Marshall Bridges, 59, American baseball player, cancer.
Fappiano, 13, American thoroughbred racehorse.
Mieczysław Fogg, 89, Polish singer.
Betty Glamann, 67, American harpist.
The Minstrel, 16, Canadian-Irish thoroughbred racehorse, euthanized.
Elizabeth Douglas-Home, Baroness Home of the Hirsel, 80, British socialite, spouse of the prime minister (1963–1964).
Eugene Martynov, 42, Soviet singer, heart failure.
Wang Zhenhe, 49, Taiwanese writer.

4
Ignacio Luis Arcaya, 78, Venezuelan lawyer and politician.
Lawrence A. Cremin, 64, American education historian, heart attack.
Irene Dunne, 91, American actress (The Awful Truth), cardioplegia, heart attack.
Turan Dursun, 55-56, Turkish author and critic of Islam, shot.
Alceo Lipizer, 69, Italian footballer.
Alden Whitman, 76, American journalist, stroke.

5
Allen Adams, 44, Scottish politician, cerebral hemorrhage.
Beppo Brem, 84, West German actor, lung cancer.
Hugh Foot, Baron Caradon, 82, British colonial administrator.
Alessandro Ciceri, 58, Italian Olympic sport shooter (1956).
Roderic Alfred Gregory, 76, British physiologist.
Jack Hildyard, 82, British cinematographer.
Graham Hough, 82, English literary critic.
Jerry Iger, 87, American cartoonist (Eisner & Iger).
Ivan Mihailov, 94, Yugoslav and Bulgarian revolutionary.
Karl-Heinz Peters, 87, German film actor.
Frank Waldman, 71, American screenwriter.

6
Madaram Brahma, 87, Indian poet and dramatist.
Issan Dorsey, 57, American Sōtō Zen monk and teacher, AIDS-related complications.
Tom Fogerty, 48, American guitarist (Creedence Clearwater Revival), AIDS.
Francisco Eppens Helgueras, 77, Mexican artist.
Jack Howells, 77, Welsh filmmaker.
Len Hutton, 74, English cricketer, complications from heart surgery.
Beniamino Maggio, 83, Italian actor.
Eiji Nakano, 85, Japanese actor, stomach cancer.
Elias Nakhleh, 76-77, Israeli politician.
Herbert Spiegelberg, 86, German-American philosopher, leukemia.
Fernando Valenti, 63, American harpsichordist, heart attack.

7
Prince Filiberto, Duke of Genoa, 95, Italian royal.
Ahti Karjalainen, 67, Finnish politician, prime minister (1962–1963, 1970–1971), pancreatic cancer.
Earle E. Partridge, 90, American general.
Clärenore Stinnes, 89, German racing driver.
A. J. P. Taylor, 84, British historian, Parkinson's disease.

8
Gustav Gerhart, 68, Austrian football player.
Joe Gleason, 95, American baseball player.
Kathleen Gough, 65, British anthropologist, cancer.
Dimitar Mutafchiev, 87, Bulgarian football player.
Sven Rosendahl, 77, Swedish journalist, novelist and short story writer.
Boris Tenin, 85, Soviet actor.
Denys Watkins-Pitchford, 85, British children's author and illustrator.

9
Nicola Abbagnano, 89, Italian philosopher.
Molly Adair, 85, English actress.
Louis Awad, 75, Egyptian intellectual and a writer.
Doc Cramer, 85, American baseball player.
Samuel Doe, 39, Liberian politician, president (since 1986), torture murder.
Alexander Men, 55, Soviet theologian, murdered.
George Sime, 75, Scottish field hockey player.
Anatoly Sofronov, 79, Soviet writer.
Rimantas Stankevičius, 46, Soviet cosmonaut and pilot, plane crash.
Hugh Sutherland, 83, Canadian ice hockey player.

10
Charles Coleman, 43, American convicted murderer, execution by lethal injection.
Catharose de Petri, 88, Dutch mystic and spiritual leader.
Svend Madsen, 93, Danish gymnast and Olympic champion.
Ernst-Wilhelm Modrow, 82, German flying ace during World War II.
Zoltán Rozsnyai, 64, Hungarian conductor, heart attack.

11
F. F. Bruce, 80, Scottish biblical scholar.
Cai Chang, 90, Chinese politician and women's rights activist.
Myrna Chang, 40, Guatemalan anthropologist, stabbed.
Byron Eby, 85, American football player.
Julius Jacobsen, 75, Danish composer.
Iris von Roten-Meyer, 73, Swiss journalist, suicide.

12
Irena Eichlerówna, 82, Polish actress.
Ivica Kurtini, 68, Yugoslav Olympic water polo player (1948, 1952).
Nancy Ryles, 52, American politician, cancer.
Athene Seyler, 101, English actress.

13
Adda Husted Andersen, 92, Danish-American jeweler, silversmith, and metalsmith.
George Hardy, 78, Canadian-American labor leader, respiratory failure.
Marya Mannes, 85, American writer and critic.
Giancarlo Pajetta, 79, Italian politician.
Samuel S. Stratton, 73, American politician, member of the U.S. House of Representatives (1959–1989).

14
Nazrul Islam Babu, 41, Bangladeshi lyricist.
Wim De Craene, 40, Belgian singer, suicide by drug overdose.
Varananda Dhavaj, 70, Thai royal.
Leonid Ivanov, 69, Soviet footballer.
Lotus Long, 81, American actress.

15
Ken Domon, 80, Japanese photographer.
Valentin Filatyev, 60, Soviet cosmonaut.
David Lester, 74, American biochemist.
Max Schäfer, 83, German football player.
Gerard Veldkamp, 69, Dutch politician.

16
James Francis Carney, 75, Canadian Roman Catholic prelate, cancer.
Jesús Evaristo Casariego, 76, Spanish writer and publisher.
Steve Condos, 71, American tap dancer, heart attack.
Semyon Kurkotkin, 73, Soviet general.
Oscarino Costa Silva, 83, Brazilian football player.
Harold Palin, 74, English rugby player.
John Staton, 88, American football player and businessman.
Ron Withnall, 75, Australian politician.

17
Lucien Barrière, 67, French businessman, cardiac arrest.
Oliver Butterworth, 75, American author, cancer.
J. F. Gates Clarke, 85, Canadian-American entomologist, .
Jackie Cox, 78-79, Scottish footballer.
Janet Hill Gordon, 75, American politician.
Angelo Schiavio, 84, Italian football player.
Loretta Clemens Tupper, 84, American actress and singer.

18
Gyula Décsi, 71, Hungarian politician and jurist.
Richard Eric Holttum, 95, English botanist.
Marjan Rožanc, 59, Yugoslav writer.
Ed Sadowski, 73, American basketball player, cancer.
Walter Thompson Welford, 74, British physicist.

19
Werner Janssen, 91, American conductor.
Donal Keenan, 71, Irish Gaelic games administrator.
Allan McKinnon, 73, Canadian politician, cancer.
Ian Moir, 58, Australian rugby player.
Hermes Pan, 80, American dancer and choreographer.
Walter Tucker, 91, Canadian politician.

20
Rosa Balistreri, 63, Italian singer.
Siegfried Behrend, 56, German classical guitarist and composer.
Claude Colette, 61, French racing cyclist.
Dick Gyselman, 82, American baseball player.
Lucien Konter, 65, Luxembourgian footballer.
Thomas McGrath, 73, American poet and screenwriter.
Attilio Micheluzzi, 60, Italian comics artist.
Jackie Moran, 67, American actor, lung cancer.
Ed Robnett, 70, American football player.
Robert Rodale, 60, American publishing executive, traffic collision.

21
Jacques-Laurent Bost, 74, French journalist, cancer.
Sumner Getchell, 83, American actor.
Frans Herman, 63, Belgian Olympic runner (1952).
Takis Kanellopoulos, 56, Greek filmmaker, heart attack.
Alexander Konstantinopolsky, 80, Soviet chess player.
Rosario Livatino, 37, Italian magistrate, murdered.
Tufail Niazi, 73-74, Pakistani singer.
Charles Calvin Rogers, 61, American Army soldier, Medal of Honor recipient, prostate cancer.
Robert L. Thorndike, 79, American psychologist, heart failure.
Xu Xiangqian, 88, Chinese general.

22
Raj Bahadur, 78, Indian politician.
John A. Danaher, 91, American politician, member of the U.S. Senate (1939–1945).
Michael Swann, 70, British microbiologist.
Len Szafaryn, 62, American gridiron football player.

23
Hilliard Beyerstein, 82, Canadian politician.
William James Broughton, 77, New Zealand jockey.
Harry Z. Isaacs, 86, American businessman.
László Ladány, 76, Hungarian jesuit, China watcher, and author.

24
Kang Joon-Ho, 62, South Korean boxer and Olympic medalist.
Zlata Kolarić-Kišur, 95, Yugoslav writer.
Ladislas Smid, 75, Hungarian-French footballer.
Johnny Werts, 92, American baseball player.

25
Wilfred Burns, 73, British composer of film scores.
Stellio Lorenzi, 69, French screenwriter, cancer.
Frank C. Lynch-Staunton, 85, Canadian politician, stroke.
Sabyasachi Mukharji, 63, Indian judge and Chief Justice, heart attack.
Kaharuddin Nasution, 65, Indonesian politician.
Prafulla Chandra Sen, 93, Indian politician.
Giuseppe Valle, 86, Italian Olympic water polo player (1924).
Vjekoslav Vrančić, 86, Croatian politician.

26
Hiram Abas, 57-58, Turkish intelligence official, murdered.
Lothar Collatz, 80, German mathematician, heart attack.
Alberto Moravia, 82, Italian novelist.
Saya Zawgyi, 83, Burmese poet, writer, and academic.

27
John Aldam Aizlewood, 95, British soldier.
Marie-Thérèse Auffray, 77, French painter.
Matvey Blanter, 87, Soviet composer ("Katyusha").
Carlos Guichandut, 75, Argentine singer.
Seymour H. Knox II, 92, American academic.
María Agustina Rivas López, 70, Peruvian religious sister, shot.

28
Roy Francis Adkins, 42, English gangster, shot.
Zia Mohiuddin Dagar, 61, Indian musician.
Dan Davin, 77, English writer.
Ray Hendrick, 61, American racing driver, cancer.
Prince Karl of Leiningen, 62, German noble.
Larry O'Brien, 73, American politician and NBA commissioner, cancer.
Willy Schröder, 78, German discus thrower and Olympian.

29
Scott Bartlett, 46-47, American artist, complications from an organ transplant.
Jacques Boulas, 41, French racing cyclist.
Raffaele Forni, 84, Swiss Roman Catholic prelate, traffic collision.
Lawrence Kasha, 56, American playwright, AIDS.
Freddie Kohlman, 72, American musician, cancer.
David Park, 54-55, British computer scientist.
Patrick Tierney, 86, Irish politician.

30
Alexej Čepička, 80, Czechoslovak politician.
W. F. R. Hardie, 88, Scottish philosopher.
Rudolf Jahn, 83, German politician.
Michel Leiris, 89, French writer, heart attack.
Rob Moroso, 22, American racing driver, traffic collision.
Shankar Nag, 35, Indian actor and filmmaker, traffic collision.
Phil Napoleon, 89, Early jazz trumpeter and bandleader.
Alice Parizeau, 60, Polish-Canadian writer, cancer.
Nels Potter, 79, American baseball player.
Ruth Cheney Streeter, 94, United States Marine Corps lieutenant colonel, heart failure.
Patrick White, 78, British-Australian writer, Nobel Prize recipient (1973).
Zygmunt Zintel, 79, Polish actor.

References 

1990-09
 09